Intoxicated Demons: The EP is the debut extended play by American hip hop trio The Beatnuts. It was released in April 1993 via Violator/Relativity Records. Recording sessions took place at Variety Recording Studio in New York and at LGK Studios in New Jersey. It features one guest vocalist, V.I.C., on the track "World's Famous". Two singles, "Reign of the Tec" and "No Equal", were released in promotion of the album. The album was received positively for its diverse beats and comedic lyrics.

It peaked at number 50 on the US Billboard Top R&B/Hip-Hop Albums chart, and its single "Reign of the Tec" peaked at number 50 on the US Billboard Hot Rap Songs.

Track listing

Personnel
Lester "Psycho Les" Fernandez – vocals (tracks: 2, 4, 6, 7, 11)
Jerry "JuJu" Tineo – vocals (tracks: 2, 4, 6, 7)
Berntony "Fashion" Smalls – vocals (tracks: 6, 7, 9, 11)
Victor "V.I.C." Padilla – vocals (track 2)
Rich Keller – recording, mixing (tracks: 3-11)
John Famolari – recording
Kirk Yano – mixing (tracks: 1, 2)
Benjamin Arrindell – engineering assistant
Jack Hersca – engineering assistant
Michael Sarsfield – mastering
David Bett – art direction
Kathy Milone – design
Linda Covello – photography
Chris Lighty – executive producer
Peter Kang – executive producer

Charts

References

External links

1993 debut EPs
The Beatnuts albums
Relativity Records albums
Albums produced by the Beatnuts